Hudson Township may refer to:

Arkansas
 Hudson Township, Newton County, Arkansas, in Newton County, Arkansas

Illinois
 Hudson Township, McLean County, Illinois

Indiana
 Hudson Township, LaPorte County, Indiana

Michigan
 Hudson Township, Charlevoix County, Michigan
 Hudson Township, Lenawee County, Michigan
 Hudson Township, Mackinac County, Michigan

Minnesota
 Hudson Township, Douglas County, Minnesota

Missouri
 Hudson Township, Bates County, Missouri
 Hudson Township, Macon County, Missouri

North Carolina
 Hudson Township, Caldwell County, North Carolina, in Caldwell County, North Carolina

North Dakota
 Hudson Township, Dickey County, North Dakota, in Dickey County, North Dakota

Ohio
 Hudson Township, Summit County, Ohio, defunct

South Dakota
 Hudson Township, Edmunds County, South Dakota, in Edmunds County, South Dakota

Township name disambiguation pages